Arnold Riegger (July 8, 1920 – July 6, 1996) was an American sports shooter. He competed in the trap event at the 1960 Summer Olympics.

Riegger was born in Bothell, Washington, and grew up in the small town of Ryderwood, Washington. He won three national championships in trap shooting and was inducted into the Amateur Trapshooting Hall of Fame in 1975. Riegger died on July 6, 1996, shortly before his 76th birthday, in Battle Ground, Washington.

References

External links
 

1920 births
1996 deaths
American male sport shooters
Olympic shooters of the United States
Shooters at the 1960 Summer Olympics
People from Bothell, Washington